de Reiger and variant forms Reiger, Reigers, and De Reijger is a Dutch surname. Notable people with the surname include:

Kerreen Reiger (born 1946), an Australian academic, sociologist and author. 
Margie Reiger,  a silent movie actress. 

Reiger or  de Rieger is also a placename:

De Reiger, a windmill and smock mill in Nijetrijne, Friesland, Netherlands
Reiger Park, a township in Gauteng, South Africa.

See also 
 De Dans van de Reiger, a 1966 Dutch film 
 Heron (De Reiger means 'the heron' in Dutch.)

Surnames of Dutch origin